Jiggiri Records is a record label that focuses on Latin music, including reggaeton, tropical music, jazz, reggae, Latin alternative and hip-hop, founded in Loíza, Puerto Rico by Tego Calderón and housed in Calderón's recording facility named El Sitio. Jiggiri was founded in 2001.

Artists 
 Tego Calderón
 Chyno Nyno
 El Choco

Albums

Studio albums 
Tego Calderon
 El Abayarde (2003)
 El Enemy de los Guasíbiri (2004)
 The Underdog/El Subestimado (2006)
 El Abayarde Contraataca (2007)

Zion y Lennox

 Motivando a la Yal (2004)
 Motivando a la Yal: Special Edition (2005)

Julio Voltio

 Voltage AC (2004)

John Eric

 El Peso Completo (2005)

Compilation albums 
 Tego Calderón
 2005: White Lion Hits Version, Vol. 1

Mixtapes 
 Tego Calderón
 2008: Gongoli
 2012: The Original Gallo Del País - O.G. El Mixtape

Future releases 
 Tego Calderón
 El Que Sabe, Sabe (2015)

Producers 
 Almonte
 Chile
 Pirulo
 La Prole

See also 
 Lists of record labels

References 

Puerto Rican record labels
Record labels established in 2005
Reggaeton record labels